Raphael Nomiye (February 1963 - November 2013) is a Nigerian politician and legislator in the House of Representatives of Nigeria, representing Ilaje and Ese Odo Federal Constituency of Ondo State, Nigeria.

Early life
Nomiye was born on February 6, 1963, in Ugbo, a town in Ilaje local government area of Ondo State, southwestern Nigeria.
He attended Kings College of commerce in Rivers State, southern Nigeria before he obtained a Bachelor of Science degree in Public Administration from the University of Benin in Edo State.

Political life
In 2011, he was nominated by the Labour Party of Nigeria to contest the seat of his constituency, Ilaje and Ese Odo Federal Constituency of Ondo State, Nigeria, which he won. He occupied this seat until his demise in November 2013.

See also
Ilaje-Ese Odo by-election

References

1963 births
Members of the House of Representatives (Nigeria)
2013 deaths
Yoruba politicians
People from Ondo State